Fred W. Roberts (November 16, 1875 – July 28, 1959) was an American football player and coach from Wellington, Kansas. He served as the University of Oklahoma's third head football coach. He coached the Sooners during the 1901 season and led the team to a 3–2 record. He quit after that first year to farm, but he was always ready to appear at a big game if the team needed a halfback.

Roberts died at his home in Caldwell, Kansas on July 28, 1959, at the age of 83.

Head coaching record

References

External links
Fred Roberts on Find a Grave

1875 births
1959 deaths
American football halfbacks
Player-coaches
Oklahoma Sooners football coaches
Oklahoma Sooners football players
People from Wellington, Kansas
Coaches of American football from Kansas
Players of American football from Kansas